Keith-Lucas is a surname. This surname was used by three brothers in honour of their father Keith Lucas:

Alan Keith-Lucas (1910–1995), social worker and professor
David Keith-Lucas (1911–1997), aeronautical engineer
Sarah Keith-Lucas (born 1982), BBC weather presenter, grand-daughter of David
Bryan Keith-Lucas (1912–1996), political scientist

See also
Keith Lucas (disambiguation)
Keith (surname)
Lucas (surname)

Compound surnames
English-language surnames
Surnames of English origin